The 2013 ADAC Formel Masters was the sixth season of the ADAC Formel Masters series, an open-wheel motor racing series for emerging young racing drivers based in Germany. The season began on 27 April at Motorsport Arena Oschersleben and finished on 29 September at Hockenheim after eight race weekends, totalling 24 races.

ADAC Berlin-Brandenburg e.V. driver Alessio Picariello dominated the battle for the drivers' championship from start to finish taking twelve wins from the 24 races on his way to the championship title. Other race wins were shared between his teammates Maximilian Günther and Hendrik Grapp, Schiller Motorsport drivers Jason Kremer and Fabian Schiller, Neuhauser Racing drivers Nicolas Beer and Marvin Dienst, Lotus drivers Indy Dontje and Beitske Visser, as well as Team KUG Motorsport driver Ralph Boschung, who inherited his first win after Picariello was penalised at the Automotodróm Slovakia Ring.

Teams and drivers

Race calendar and results
 The 2013 calendar was announced on 8 November 2012.

Championship standings

Drivers' Championship
Points are awarded as follows:

Teams' championship

References

External links
 Official Website 
 ADAC Masters Weekend 

ADAC Formel Masters
ADAC Formel Masters seasons
ADAC Formel Masters